This is a list of Jamaica High School Football Champions, the champion high schools are winners of the football competitions that have been held in Jamaica. The first competitive games were played in 1909. The Manning Cup and Walker Cup are contested among schools in the Corporate Area (comprising the parishes of Kingston, St. Andrew and most of St. Catherine) while the DaCosta and Ben Francis Cups are contested by schools from the Rural Area (comprising all other 11 parishes including a few from Saint Catherine, e.g. Dinthill Technical).  The Olivier Shield and Super Cup are contested by both Corporate and Rural Area schools with the Olivier Shield contested, in a home-and-away two-leg format, by the winners of the Manning & DaCosta Cups that season and is the last cup to be decided each season with the possibility of the title being shared if the scores were tied after two games. This format was changed by ISSA to a one-leg, play-to-finish format following the 2013 season which meant the title could no longer be shared. The Super Cup is contested by the top eight schools each from the Corporate and Rural Area, that season, in a one-leg knockout format with every first knockout round contested by a Rural Area versus Corporate Area school based on their rankings (top four in one Area are each drawn to play one of the bottom four in the other Area and vice versa). In 2018, the Flow Super Cup was renamed the ISSA Champions Cup after the initial sponsorship agreement ended with Flow. Jamaica College has won the Manning Cup more than any other team, winning the trophy 31 times.

List of Champions

Current Competitions
The following table shows the lists of winners in the contested finals for the various competitions held.

Past Competitions

The Nutrament Shield was played between the Champions of the Walker Cup and the Ben Francis Knock Out Competitions. The Nutrament Shield was contested for only four years in 1983, 1985, 1986 and 1987.

Competition Team Rankings

Urban Area

Rural Area

Olivier Shield and Flow Super Cup/ISSA Champions Cup Competitions

See also
Manning Cup

Notes

References

External links
Jamaica - List of Cup Winners
Jamaican Schoolboy Football - Manning Cup Winners List

High